Mela Raghu (Puthenveli Sasidharan, died: May 3, 2021) was an Indian actor who worked in the Malayalam film industry.

Biography 
In 1980, at a circus show in Kozhikode, he caught the attention of actor Sreenivasan and got the opportunity to act in the film Mela. With his performance in this film, he came to be known as Mela Raghu. He later acted in a few films and appeared in over 30 films in Malayalam and Tamil, including the Tamil film Apoorva Sagodharargal. His last film was Drishyam 2.

He and his wife Syamala had a daughter, Shilpa.

Death 
Raghu died on May 3, 2021, at Amrita Institute of Medical science Hospital in Kochi due to various health problems.

Filmography 

 Mela (1980) as Govindan Kutty
 Sanchari (1981)
 Kakkothikkavile Appooppan Thaadikal (1988)
 Apoorva Sagodharargal (1989)
 Irikku M.D. Akathundu (1991) as Man applying for job
 Mukha Chithram (1991)
 O' Faby (1993)
 Athbhutha Dweepu (2005)
 Best Actor (2010)
 Oru Indian Pranayakadha (2013)
 Drishyam (2013)
 Drishyam 2 (2021)

References 

Male actors in Malayalam cinema
2021 deaths
People from Alappuzha district